Pavel Alexeyevich Serebryakov (February 28, 1909 in Tsaritsyn – August 17, 1977 in Leningrad) was a Soviet pianist.

Serebryakov began touring the USSR after ranking 2nd at the I National Competition (1933). A professor at the Leningrad Conservatory, he was the institution's rector from 1938–51 and from 1961 until his death. He was a People's Artist of the USSR (1962).

References 
 The New Grove dictionary of music and musicians. XVII, page 159.
 Musical Portraits of the 20th Century - LXXVIII, The Voice of Russia

1909 births
1977 deaths
Musicians from Volgograd
Soviet classical pianists